Public Holidays in Turkmenistan are laid out in the Constitution of Turkmenistan, It acts as a list of nationally recognized public holidays in the country.

Main public holidays
 New Year's Day (January 1)
 International Women's Day (March 8)
 Nowruz (March 21–22)
 State Flag and Constitution Day (May 18)
 Independence Day (September 27)
 Day of Remembrance (October 6)
 Day of Neutrality (December 12)
 Eid al-Fitr (date varies)
 Eid al-Adha (date varies)

Professional holidays
 Memorial Day (January 12)
 Defender of the Fatherland Day (January 28)
 Day of Remembrance of National Heroes of Turkmenistan in the 1941-1945 World War (May 9)
 Day of Revival, Unity, and the Poetry of Magtymguly (May 18–19)
 Carpet Day (Last Sunday in May)
 Day of Turkmen Workers of Culture and Art (June 27)
 Third Sunday in July – Galla Bayramy (celebration of the wheat harvest)
 Day of the Ministry of Internal Affairs (May 29)
 Border Guards Day (August 11)
 Day of the Workers in the Oil, Gas, Power, and Geological Industry (Second Saturday in September)
 Turkmen Bakhshi Day (Second Sunday in September)
 Day of the Worker in the Organs of National Security (September 30)
 Day of the Navy (October 9)
 Health Day (First Saturday in November)

Other holidays
 Turkmen Melon Day (Second Sunday in August)
 Good Neighborliness Day (First Sunday in December)
 Day of Remembrance of the First President of Turkmenistan Saparmurat Niyazov

References
 Independent Neutral Turkmenistan: 10 Glorious Years of the Epoch of Turkmenbashi the Great, Ashgabat, 2001, pp. 49–51 .
 Turkmenistan to the Heights of the Golden Age, Ashgabat, 2005, p. 44.
 Statistical Yearbook of Turkmenistan 2000-2004, National Institute of State Statistics and Information of Turkmenistan, Ashgabat, 2005, pp. 6–7.

Further reading

External links
Holidays in Turkmenistan

 
Turkmenistan